The 1952–53 NBA season was the Royals fifth season in the NBA.

Draft picks

Roster

Regular season

Season standings

x – clinched playoff spot

Record vs. opponents

Game log

Playoffs

|- align="center" bgcolor="#ffcccc"
| 1
| March 20
| Fort Wayne
| L 77–84
| Arnie Risen (17)
| Edgerton Park Arena
| 0–1
|- align="center" bgcolor="#ccffcc"
| 2
| March 22
| @ Fort Wayne
| W 83–71
| Bobby Wanzer (19)
| War Memorial Coliseum
| 1–1
|- align="center" bgcolor="#ffcccc"
| 3
| March 24
| Fort Wayne
| L 65–67
| Bobby Wanzer (17)
| Edgerton Park Arena
| 1–2
|-

Player statistics

Season

Playoffs

Awards and records
 Bob Davies, All-NBA Second Team
 Bobby Wanzer, All-NBA Second Team

Transactions

References

Sacramento Kings seasons
Roc
Rochester Royals
Rochester Royals